Agorius constrictus is a species of ant mimicking jumping spider from Singapore.

Description
Both sexes are about 6 mm long. The orange-brown cephalothorax is about twice as long as wide, with its posterior edge forming a transverse depression behind the rear eyes. The very long opisthosoma mimics the shape of certain ants, with a small dark oval anterior part, a slender whitish "waist" and a large dark oval posterior part. The long slender legs are lightish orange.

References

  (2000): An Introduction to the Spiders of South East Asia. Malaysian Nature Society, Kuala Lumpur.
  (2007): The world spider catalog, version 8.0. American Museum of Natural History.

External links

 Salticidae.org: Diagnostic drawings and photograph

Salticidae
Endemic fauna of Singapore
Spiders of Asia
Spiders described in 1901